David Spencer Quall (January 26, 1936 – November 12, 2020) was an American educator and politician who served as a Democratic member of the Washington House of Representatives from the 40th district from 1993 to 2011.

Biography
Quall attended Seattle Pacific University and earned a Master's Degree in Education Guidance and Counseling in 1974. He worked for thirty-eight years in education.

As a representative, he served as Chair of the Education Committee, and he has been a member of the Economic Development, Agriculture and Trade Committee.

His legislative priorities were to "help public schools meet the new high standards of Education Reform," "Increasing family-wage jobs and a healthy economic climate," and to make "home-ownership affordable for young families starting out".

In 2006 he faced Republican challenger Yoshe Revelle for Representative District No. 40, Position No. 1 and easily defeated him with the help of campaign manager Miriam Witt.

He died on November 12, 2020, at age 84.

References

External links
 Official Biography
 Contact Information

1936 births
2020 deaths
People from Bellingham, Washington
Seattle Pacific University alumni
Democratic Party members of the Washington House of Representatives